Uncle Jasper's Will (also released as Jasper Landry's Will) is a 1922 race film directed, produced and written by Oscar Micheaux. The film is a drama about the contents of a last will and testament left behind by an African-American sharecropper who was lynched after being falsely accused of the murder of a white plantation owner. The film was intended as a sequel to Micheaux’s landmark feature Within Our Gates (1920).

Cast
William Fountaine 
Shingzie Howard
Alma Sewell
Harry Henderson (actor)

See also
List of lost films

References

External links

1922 films
American silent feature films
American black-and-white films
Films directed by Oscar Micheaux
Lost American films
Race films
1922 drama films
Silent American drama films
1922 lost films
Lost drama films
1920s American films